American Gladiators may refer to:

American Gladiators (1989 TV series), an American competition television program that aired from 1989 to 1996
American Gladiators (2008 TV series), an American competition television program that aired in 2008
American Gladiators (video game), a video game made in 1991 by Imagitec Design

See also

 
 
 American (disambiguation)
 Gladiator (disambiguation)
 Gladiators 2000, children's edition of the 1989 show
 Gladiators (franchise), franchise for the 1989, 2008, and video game